Robert Nachinab Doameng (born November 1, 1953) is a Ghanaian politician and member of the Sixth Parliament of the Fourth Republic of Ghana representing the Talensi Constituency in the  Upper East Region on the ticket of the New Patriotic Party.

Personal life 
Doameng is a Christian (Catholic). He is married (with three children).

Early life and education 
Doameng was born on November 1, 1953. He hails from Tongo, a town in the Upper East Region of Ghana. He entered University of Cape Coast, Ghana and obtained his master's degree in Environmental Management and Policy in 2008.

Politics 
Doameng is a member of the New Patriotic Party (NPP). In 2012, he contested for the Talensi  seat on the ticket of the NPP sixth parliament of the fourth republic and won.

References

1953 births
Living people
New Patriotic Party politicians
Ghanaian MPs 2013–2017